Poliopastea splendida is a moth of the subfamily Arctiinae. It was described by Arthur Gardiner Butler in 1876.

References

Poliopastea
Moths described in 1876